WBQD-LP (channel 26) is a defunct low-power analog television station licensed to Davenport, Iowa, United States, which operated from 2002 to 2011. Last owned by Four Seasons Broadcasting (a partnership between Cleveland-based Malibu Broadcasting and Los Angeles–based Venture Technologies Group, LLC), it was affiliated with UPN and MyNetworkTV. The station was operated under a local marketing agreement (LMA) and a technical services agreement by The New York Times Company, and later by Local TV LLC, as a sister station to Moline, Illinois–licensed ABC affiliate WQAD-TV (channel 8). WBQD-LP's operations were housed at WQAD-TV's studios on Park 16th Street in the Prospect Park section of Moline; its transmitter was located on 70th Street, next to Black Hawk College, near Moline's Poplar Grove neighborhood.

Upon going silent in December 2011, WBQD-LP was the second-to-last television station in the Quad Cities market to broadcast an analog signal, having been surpassed only by 3ABN translator station K16EL (now K20KF-D) which flash cut to digital operations in September 2012.

History
Northwest Television, the original owner of Galesburg, Illinois-licensed WMWC-TV, had applied for a license to broadcast on channel 53 and had planned to sign on September 1, 2001 as the UPN affiliate for the Quad Cities television market, with operations for the proposed station to be handled by Second Generation of Iowa, owner of KFXA in Cedar Rapids. However, the application for the new station was challenged by Grant Broadcasting System II, then-owner of KLJB-TV and KGWB-TV. In December 2001 after receiving permission to begin broadcasting on UHF channel 26, this station began transmitter tests and on February 4, 2002, signed on as WBQD-LP with the UPN affiliation that was originally to have gone to WMWC. In November 2004, it was announced that WBQD would enter into a joint sales agreement with WQAD. On September 5, 2006, WBQD became a MyNetworkTV affiliate. It adopted the nickname "My TV 16" in reference to its channel number on Mediacom. WBQD's over-the-air signal only covered the immediate Quad Cities area due to its low-power status, but most viewers watched the station via its simulcast on WQAD's third digital subchannel, which covers the entire market. It also shared its analog channel allocation with KGWB (which was licensed to and transmitted from Burlington, Iowa to the south), an unusual arrangement for a low-power and full-power station in the same general television market.

The station had a construction permit for a low-power digital transmitter on VHF channel 7 with the calls WBQD-LD. However, on June 30, 2009, Four Seasons Broadcasting filed for digital displacement relief and requested to move its digital channel assignment to UHF channel 14 instead. After an engineering study, it was determined that even as a low-power digital station, WBQD would cause and/or receive more than acceptable interference to and from KWWL in Waterloo, Iowa and KHQA-TV in Hannibal, Missouri, both of which are full power digital television stations that broadcast on channel 7 and had "flash-cut" to their former analog channels after the digital transition.

While transmitting an analog signal, Four Seasons Broadcasting initially operated WBQD outright from 2002 to 2004. However, they had WBQD operated through a local marketing agreement (LMA) by The New York Times Company from 2004 to 2007 and by Local TV LLC from 2007 to 2011. This made it a sister outlet to WQAD and the two outlets shared studios. However, some internal operations of WBQD (such as the maintenance of program logs) were actually based at the shared facilities of co-owned MyNetworkTV affiliate WAOE as well as ABC/CW affiliate WHOI and NBC affiliate WEEK-TV in East Peoria, Illinois. During the overnight hours, WBQD aired paid programming from Corner Store TV.

On December 9, 2011, WBQD-LP notified the Federal Communications Commission (FCC) that they went silent after losing their tower lease on the Black Hawk College campus in Moline. This occurred more than a year after Black Hawk College sold public broadcasting station WQPT-TV to Western Illinois University-Quad Cities though there is no indication of any connection to this. However, on June 6, 2013, the FCC canceled the license of WBQD-LP, after being off the air for over a year. After WBQD went silent in December 2011, WQAD, which had for years been simulcasting WBQD's programming and MyNetworkTV affiliation in 480i 4:3 standard definition on digital subchannel 8.3 (WQAD-DT3), began operating the signal outright on channel 8.3, rebranding it as "My TV 8.3" in reference to the station's virtual channel location. WQAD-DT3 later tweaked its branding to "My TV 8-3." As WQAD is continuing to broadcast its programming on their own subchannel and cable providers used 8.3 as their signal source for the station for years, the low-powered license for WBQD-LP was practically all but redundant. On October 9, 2012, the cable channel assignment for WQAD-DT3 on Mediacom moved from channel 16 to channel 3.

WMWC-TV was eventually granted its construction permit on July 20, 2007, and it finally signed on in August 2012 as a religious station affiliated with TBN. Since December 2012, WMWC has been owned and operated by TBN.

On July 1, 2013, Local TV LLC announced that all of their stations, including WQAD, would be acquired by the Tribune Company. On April 22, 2014, WQAD-DT3 began broadcasting in high definition, utilizing MyNetworkTV's standard 720p format.

Sources

See also
WMWC-TV, the original "proposed" UPN affiliate for the Quad Cities market, now a religious station affiliated with TBN
WQAD-DT3, the successor of WBQD-LP and the current MyNetworkTV affiliate for the Quad Cities market
WAOE, WBQD's sister station in Peoria, also a MyNetworkTV affiliate and another former UPN affiliate

External links
WQAD-TV
On-air Screengrabs from WBQD-LP Courtesy of Upper Midwest Broadcasting

Television channels and stations established in 2002
Television channels and stations disestablished in 2011
Television stations in Iowa
Television stations in Illinois
Defunct television stations in the United States
Television stations in the Quad Cities
MyNetworkTV affiliates
2002 establishments in Iowa
2011 disestablishments in Iowa
Defunct mass media in Iowa